Alain Metellus (born April 8, 1965) is an American-born Canadian athlete. He competed in the men's high jump at the 1984 Summer Olympics. Metellus is of Haitian descent.

References

External links
 
 

1965 births
Living people
Athletes (track and field) at the 1984 Summer Olympics
Canadian male high jumpers
Olympic track and field athletes of Canada
Commonwealth Games medallists in athletics
Commonwealth Games bronze medallists for Canada
Athletes (track and field) at the 1982 Commonwealth Games
Athletes (track and field) at the 1986 Commonwealth Games
Athletes (track and field) at the 1990 Commonwealth Games
Pan American Games track and field athletes for Canada
Athletes (track and field) at the 1983 Pan American Games
World Athletics Championships athletes for Canada
Canadian sportspeople of Haitian descent
Haitian Quebecers
Black Canadian track and field athletes
Track and field athletes from New York City
Medallists at the 1986 Commonwealth Games